Gray-box testing (International English spelling: grey-box testing) is a combination of white-box testing and black-box testing. The aim of this testing is to search for the defects, if any, due to improper structure or improper usage of applications.

Overview
A black-box tester is unaware of the internal structure of the application to be tested, while a white-box tester has access to the internal structure of the application. A gray-box tester partially knows the internal structure, which includes access to the documentation of internal data structures as well as the algorithms used.

Gray-box testers require both high-level and detailed documents describing the application, which they collect in order to define test cases.

Need for gray-box testing
Gray-box testing is beneficial because it takes the straightforward technique of black-box testing and combines it with the code-targeted systems in white-box testing.

Gray-box testing is based on requirement test case generation because it presents all the conditions before the program is tested by using the assertion method. A requirement specification language is used to make it easy to understand the requirements and verify its correctness.

Gray-box testing assumptions for object-oriented software
Object-oriented software consists primarily of objects; where objects are single indivisible units having executable code and/or data. Some assumptions are stated below which are needed for the application of use gray-box testing.
 Activation of Methods
 State Reporting in Class Under Test (CUT).
 Report Testing is inherent in Class Under Test.

Examples
Architectural model
 Unified Modeling Language - UML Design Model
 Finite-state machine - State Model.

Techniques
Cem Kaner defines "gray-box testing as involving inputs and outputs, but test design is educated by information about the code or the program operation of a kind that would normally be out of view of the tester". Gray-box testing techniques are:
Matrix Testing: states the status report of the project.
 Regression testing: it implies rerunning of the test cases if new changes are made.
Pattern Testing: verify the good application for its design or architecture and patterns.
Orthogonal array testing: used as subset of all possible combination.

Effects

Positive Effects
Offers combined benefits: As Gray-box testing is combination of white-box and black-box testing, it serves advantages from both the testings.
Non Intrusive: It is based on functional specification, architectural view whereas not on source code or binaries which makes it invasive too.
Intelligent Test Authoring: Gray-box tester handles intelligent test scenario, for example, data type handling, communication protocol, exception handling.
Unbiased Testing: In spite of all above advantages and functionalities, Gray-box testing maintains boundary for testing between tester and developer.

Negative Effects
Partial code coverage: In gray-box testing, source code or binaries are missing because of limited access to internal or structure of the applications which results in limited access for code path traversal.
Defect Identification: In distributed applications, it is difficult to associate defect identification. Still, Gray-box testing is a boon to find how appropriate these systems throw exceptions and how fine are these exceptions handled in distributed systems having web services environment.

Applications
Gray-box testing is well suited for web applications. Web applications have distributed network or systems; due to absence of source code or binaries it is not possible to use white-box testing. Black-box testing is also not used due to just contract between customer and developer, so it is more efficient to use gray-box testing as significant information is available in Web Services Description Language (WSDL).
Gray-box testing is suited for functional or business domain testing. Functional testing is done basically a test of user interactions with may be external systems.  Gray-box testing is well-suited for functional testing due to its characteristics; it also helps to confirm that software meets the requirements defined for the software.

Future scope
The distributed nature of Web services allows gray-box testing to detect defects within a service-oriented architecture (SOA). As we know, white-box testing is not suitable for Web services as it deals directly with the internal structures. White-box testing can be used for state art methods; for example, message mutation which generates the automatic tests for large arrays to help exception handling states, flow without source code or binaries. Such a strategy is useful to push gray-box testing nearer to the outcomes of white-box testing.

See also
 Grey box model

References

Hardware testing
Software testing